Randy Spendlove is an American record producer, songwriter, Grammy Award winner, and music executive. As President of Motion Picture Music at Paramount Pictures, he oversees all aspects of film music where he has worked with artists including Beyoncé, Linkin Park, Green Day, U2, and Lady Gaga.

Early career

Spendlove graduated from Gilroy High School in Gilroy, California in 1982.

In 1990, Spendlove started at A&M Records as VP of Promotions where he worked with Janet Jackson, Sheryl Crow, Soundgarden, and Bryan Adams. In 1998, he became President of Motion Picture Music at Miramax Films where he worked on Chicago, Shakespeare in Love, Cold Mountain and Finding Neverland.

Paramount Pictures

Spendlove joined Paramount in 2006 as Executive Vice President of Music and Creative Affairs. In 2007, he was promoted to President of Motion Picture Music. Some of his credits include Hugo and The Adventures of Tintin, which both received Oscar nominations for Best Original Score, and Justin Bieber: Never Say Never, which brought in $73 million at the US box office.

Other Achievements

Randy Spendlove won a 2004 Grammy for Best Soundtrack Album for a Motion Picture for Chicago. He co-supervised the music and co-produced the soundtrack album for Dreamgirls, which was nominated for three Best Song Academy Awards. Spendlove also serves on the board of the Society of Young Composers, and mentors young composers and musicians at UCLA and USC and is a member of the Board of Governors for the Recording Academy (Grammys). In 2011, he was honored by the T.J. Martell Foundation and was the recipient of the T.J. Martell Foundation's "Humanitarian Award".  Additionally in 2007, Spendlove received the "Joseph Papp Racial Harmony Award" from the Foundation for Ethic Understanding. In 2012, he was Number 69 on Billboard's Power 100 list.

References 

Year of birth missing (living people)
Living people
American music industry executives
Grammy Award winners
Place of birth missing (living people)
Gilroy High School alumni